The Back Door, an album by Cherish the Ladies, was released in 1992 on the Green Linnet label.

Track listing
 "Characters' Polka/The Warlock/The Volunteer/The Donegal Traveler" – 3:54
 "The Back Door" – 4:23
 "Redican's/Sean Ryan's/Take the Bull by the Horns" – 3:29
 "The Dance: Galway Hornpipe/Dessie O'Connor's/The Moher Reel" – 2:06
 "Coal Quay Market – The Shopping Song /Happy Days/Rabbit in the Field" – 3:02
 "Máire Mhór" – 1:00
 "If Ever You Were Mine" – 3:32
 "Paddy O'Brien's/Toss The Feathers/Jenny Dang the Weaver" – 3:10
 "My Own Native Land" – 4:00
 "Pepin Arsenault/The Shepherd's Daughter/A Punch in the Dark" – 2:50
 "Three Weeks We Were Wed" – 3:04
 "Jessica's Polka/Tear the Calico/I Have No Money" – 4:07
 "Carrigdhoun" – 2:30
 "Redican's Mother/Humours of Westport/The Morning Dew/The Glass of Beer/Youghal Harbor" – 4:04

References

External links
 Complete identification of album contents at irishtune.info

Cherish the Ladies albums
1992 albums